Tritonoturris amabilis is a species of sea snail, a marine gastropod mollusk in the family Raphitomidae.

This species was placed in this genus by A.W.B. Powell in 1966.

Description
The length of the shell attains 22 mm.

The thin, white shell shows distant, thin, ridge-like ribs, and distant revolving lirae, more closely striate at the base. (described as Clathurella robillardi)

The shell contains nine whorls. The few ribs are distant and narrow. The revolving striae are fine and close. The color is pale orange-brown, the body whorl shows a narrow white band, the suture is ornamented with white spots. (described as Clathurella amabilis).

Distribution
This marine species occurs off Mauritius, Southeast Asia; Indonesia; the Philippines and Papua New Guinea.

References

 Severns, M. (2011). Shells of the Hawaiian Islands - The Sea Shells. Conchbooks, Hackenheim. 564 pp
 Liu, J.Y. [Ruiyu] (ed.). (2008). Checklist of marine biota of China seas. China Science Press. 1267 pp

External links
  Adams H. (1869). Description of a new genus and fourteen new species of marine shells. Proceedings of the Zoological Society of London. (1869): 272–275, pl. 19
 Brazier, J. 1876. A list of the Pleurotomidae collected during the Chevert expedition, with the description of the new species. Proceedings of the Linnean Society of New South Wales 1: 151–162
  Kay, E. A. (1979). Hawaiian marine shells. Reef and shore fauna of Hawaii. Section 4: Mollusca. Bernice P. Bishop Museum Special Publications. 64xviii + 1–653
 Moretzsohn, Fabio, and E. Alison Kay. "HAWAIIAN MARINE MOLLUSCS." (1995)
 
 Gastropods.com: Tritonoturris amabilis

amabilis
Gastropods described in 1843